Mayfair Ballroom was a ballroom and concert hall situated on Newgate Street in Newcastle upon Tyne, England. The oblong room was built to hold 1,500 people and had a small stage along one of the longer walls. It was opened in September 1961 by the Mecca organisation.

It was also host to a popular rave music event during the early 1990s called the Rezerection. DJs and live PAs including Carl Cox, Joey Beltram, Grooverider, Njoi and The Prodigy performed there.

Artists that played the venue, early in their careers, include AC/DC, The Who, Free, Pink Floyd, Queen, the Police, Shy, the Prodigy, Black Grape, the Cross, Kylie Minogue, Daft Punk, Tin Machine, U2, the Clash, Iron Maiden, Metallica, Faith No More, Judas Priest, Bodycount and Nirvana,  The Glitter Band  among others. Jet played at the venue in 1975, when guitarist David O'List tied himself up with his guitar cord, collapsing to the floor and unable to resume a vertical position until rescued by the road crew.

Led Zeppelin's first ever live performance in the United Kingdom was at the Mayfair Ballroom on 4 October 1968. Free's final live performance in the UK took place at the venue on 20 October 1972. At the end of the show, guitarist Paul Kossoff broke the neck of his cherished Les Paul guitar after uncharacteristically throwing it into the air in frustration.

In 1999 the Mayfair was demolished and replaced with a retail and entertainment venue called The Gate. The closing night was attended by 5,000 people.

References

External links
Web Site commemorating the venue

Buildings and structures in Newcastle upon Tyne
Concert halls in England
Music venues in Tyne and Wear
Demolished buildings and structures in England
Buildings and structures demolished in 1999
Former theatres in England